The Nembo class was a class of destroyer of the Italian Regia Marina (Royal Navy). Six destroyers were built by the Pattison shipyard of Naples between 1899 and 1905, to a design based on the contemporary destroyers of the British shipyard Thornycroft. They were active in the Italo-Turkish War and in the First World War, where three were lost.

Design
In 1899, work began on at the Pattison shipyard of Naples on the first ships of a new class of destroyers, the Nembo class. The Nembo class were based on a design by the British shipbuilders Thornycroft, and were similar to the Thirty-knotter destroyers that Thornycroft were building for the British Royal Navy (such as ).

Displacement was  normal and  full load. The ships featured a raised turtleback forecastle and two funnels. Crew was between 51 and 58 officers and men.

The six ships of the class were completed between 1902 and 1905, reaching speeds of up to  during sea trials (corresponding to a realistic sea speed of ).

Nembo and Turbine were rearmed in 1905 to match the other four ships. From 1908, all ships of the class were fitted with new oil-fired boilers, with a resulting change in the ships' profile, with three funnels being fitted rather than two. The ships' armament was changed at the same time, to four 76 mm/40 guns and two 450 mm (18 in) torpedo tubes.

Service
The ships of the class were active during the Italo-Turkish War of 1911–1912. They were fitted for minelaying, with a capacity of 10–16 mines during the First World War, during which three destroyers were lost. Following the end of the war, the remaining three ships had a boiler removed, with the consequent loss of a funnel, together with a 76 mm gun, and were reclassified as torpedo boats.

Ships

Notes

Citations

References

External links
 Classe Nembo Marina Militare website

Destroyer classes
 
World War I naval ships of Italy